Belovo is a rural locality (a selo) in Ust-Pristansky District, Altai Krai, Russia. The population was 171 in 2016. There are 9 streets.

Geography 
Belovo is located 31 km north of Ust-Charyshskaya Pristan (the district's administrative centre) by road. Vyatkino is the nearest rural locality.

References 

Rural localities in Ust-Pristansky District